Gharua is a village located within the Sheola Union, Beanibazar Upazila, Sylhet District, Bangladesh.  Its population is less than 500 people. Gharua has a government primary school.

References

Villages in Sylhet District
Beanibazar Upazila